Philetus of Antioch was the eleventh bishop of Antioch, between 218 AD or 220 AD and 231 AD, successor of Asclepiades in the Church of Antioch and predecessor of Zebinnus, according to Eusebius of Caesarea. His bishopric took place while Elagabalus and Severus Alexander were emperors.

References 

Patriarchs of Antioch